A Son of the Sun may refer to:

 A Son of the Sun (album), a 2008 album by Uyama Hiroto
 A Son of the Sun (novel), a 1912 novel by Jack London
 Son of the Sun, a 2008 Turkish film
 "The Son of the Sun", a 1987 Scrooge McDuck comics story by Don Rosa